Three Bridges railway station is located in and named after the village of Three Bridges, which is now a district of Crawley, West Sussex, England. It is at the point where the Arun Valley Line diverges from the Brighton Main Line and Thameslink,  down the line from  via .

History
The original Italianate style railway station on the East side of the line at Three Bridges was opened in July 1841 by the London and Brighton Railway at a point next to their proposed branch to Horsham. It was designed by the architect David Mocatta, and was one of a series of standardised modular buildings used by the railway. This building was demolished 5 May 1985. Mocatta's plans for the station indicate that it was originally going to be known as "Crawley" but according to The London and Brighton railway guide, of 1841 and the 1846 timetable it was named "Three Bridges" from the time it was opened.

Enlargement
The London and Brighton Railway merged with others to become the London Brighton and South Coast Railway in 1846, and the branch to Horsham was opened two years later. Three Bridges was enlarged in July 1855 with the construction of a branch line to East Grinstead and again enlarged in 1906/9 at the time of the quadrupling of the main line. The present ticket office was then built on the west side of the line and new platforms and station buildings for the new lines.

Electrification
Three Bridges was a key site for the electrification scheme for the Brighton main line during 1932/33, housing the control room for the scheme, and was one of three locations where current was taken from the national network and transmitted to substations. Electric multiple unit trains began to run between London and Three Bridges on 17 July 1932. The line was electrified throughout on 30 December. At the same time the practice of using "slip coaches" for East Grinstead at Three Bridges from expresses bound for the south coast was abandoned by the Southern Railway. The line from Three Bridges to Horsham was electrified in May 1938. The single-track branch line to East Grinstead was never electrified. It remained steam operated, using tank locomotives of the M7 and H classes hauling push–pull trains. After the end of steam operation in 1964, it was then briefly operated by diesel-electric multiple units of British Rail Class 205 but closed on 2 January 1967.

Accidents
There have been four recorded accidents at Three Bridges station, the first two of which were relatively minor and involved no injuries. On 12 April 1858 an engine collided with passenger carriages, and on 18 October 1863 an excursion train hit the buffer stops. Two members of station staff died on 13 December 1868 from an explosion of naphtha in a truck of a goods train.  On 28 January 1933 an electric train crashed into the back of a steam freight train waiting at the signal box. The driver of the electric train and the guard of the freight train were both seriously injured.

Recent history
In 2021, a tactile map was installed, in collaboration with the Royal National Institute of Blind People, to help blind and partially sighted passengers navigate the station.

Related rail facilities

Locomotive depot and goods yard

An engine shed was opened in July 1848 on a site to the west of the station. This was closed in 1909 to make way for the enlargement of the station and a new depot was established in the fork between the Brighton and Horsham lines in 1911, which remained open until June 1964.

The original small goods yard to the south of the station was greatly extended during the First World War and was used as a marshalling yard for munitions trains heading for the Continent. Trains from the Great Western Railway and the London and North Western Railway were brought here for onward transmission to Newhaven Harbour.

In the early 2000s, Virgin CrossCountry built a depot at Three Bridges operated by English Welsh and Scottish Railway to service its Class 220 Voyagers. It closed following CrossCountry withdrawing its Gatwick and Brighton services in December 2008 and was subsequently demolished and replaced with EMU stabling sidings.

Three Bridges rail operating centre

In 2010 Network Rail selected Three Bridges as its preferred site for a signalling centre for trains operating in the southeast of England, being central to the London, Brighton, and future Thameslink services, and with no major negative planning issues. Equipment was primarily on the ground floor, with the operation rooms on first and second floors.

In December 2011, Network Rail began construction of a rail operating centre at Three Bridges, one of 14 countrywide intended to replace several hundred signalboxes; the Three Bridges centre was built to control rail operations in the Sussex area. The facility was constructed by C. Spencer Ltd, and was expected to employ around 600 people, with a 900-person net job benefit once complete. The facility was officially opened in January 2014, with the last section of London Bridge Area Signalling Centre moving to the Three Bridges site in 2020.

Three Bridges rolling stock depot

In 2009 Network Rail submitted a planning application for a rolling stock depot including a three road shed for trains to be procured under the Thameslink rolling stock programme; rejection of the plans for a sister depot at Hornsey resulted in modified plans being submitted in 2011, with the Three Bridges depot expanded to a five road shed with additional stabling and facilities. The depot was opened in October 2015.

Current services
The station remains an important junction on the Brighton Main Line throughout Southern Railway and British Railways ownership. Train services are now provided by Southern and Thameslink train operating companies.

Facilities
Besides a booking hall, the station has refreshment facilities and shops, as well as toilets and accessibility lifts to platforms.

Platform layout
Platform 1: - From Crawley to London via Redhill - Some fast services in the peaks
Platform 2: - To London via Redhill / Down to Chichester (off-peak) (Up Slow) Some Terminus from Victoria and Bedford (Down Slow)
Platform 3: - To Horsham/Bognor/Crawley - Occasionally Brighton (Down Slow)
Platform 4: - To Bedford - Most Thameslink and Fast Victoria services (Up Fast)
Platform 5: - To Brighton and/or Eastbourne and/or Littlehampton (Down Fast)

Services
Services at Three Bridges are operated by Southern and Thameslink using  and  EMUs.

The typical off-peak service in trains per hour is:
 2 tph to 
 4 tph to  via  (2 of these run via Redhill) 
 2 tph to 
 2 tph to  via 
 4 tph to 

On Sundays, the services to London Victoria and Cambridge reduce to hourly and the service to Peterborough runs hourly but only as far as London Bridge.

During the night, the station is served by a half-hourly Thameslink service to Bedford (not calling at London Bridge). This service runs on Sunday-Friday nights with an hourly Southern service to London Victoria on Saturday nights.

References

Sources

External links

Buildings and structures in Crawley
Transport in Crawley
Former London, Brighton and South Coast Railway stations
Railway stations in West Sussex
DfT Category C1 stations
Railway stations in Great Britain opened in 1841
Railway stations served by Govia Thameslink Railway
David Mocatta railway stations